Siamese Ponds are located northwest of Oregon, New York.

Upper pond
Fish species present in the lake are rainbow trout, black bullhead, white sucker, lake trout, lake whitefish, brook trout, and sunfish. There is carry down access off CR-8 on the east shore. No motors are allowed on this lake.

Lower pond 
Fish species present in the lake are rainbow trout, black bullhead, white sucker, lake trout, lake whitefish, brook trout, and sunfish. There is carry down access off CR-8 on the east shore. No motors are allowed on this lake.

References

Lakes of New York (state)
Lakes of Warren County, New York